General elections were held in Liechtenstein on 1 September 1957. The Progressive Citizens' Party won eight of the 15 seats in the Landtag, but remained in coalition with the Patriotic Union.

Results

By electoral district

References

Liechtenstein
1957 in Liechtenstein
Elections in Liechtenstein
September 1957 events in Europe